The Red Woman is a 1917 American silent Western film directed by Harry R. Durant and starring Gail Kane, Mahlon Hamilton and June Elvidge.

Cast
 Gail Kane as Maria Temosach 
 Mahlon Hamilton as Morton Deal 
 Edward Roseman as Sancho
 June Elvidge as Dora Wendell 
 Charlotte Granville as Her Mother 
 Gladys Earlcott as Chica

References

Bibliography
 Angela Aleiss. Making the White Man's Indian: Native Americans and Hollywood Movies. Greenwood Publishing Group, 2005.

External links
 

1917 films
1917 Western (genre) films
American black-and-white films
Films directed by Harry R. Durant
Silent American Western (genre) films
World Film Company films
1910s English-language films
1910s American films